Jennifer Iris Rachel Montagu  (born 20 March 1931) is a British art historian with emphasis in the study of Italian Baroque sculpture.

Early life
Montagu is a daughter of Ewen Montagu, a British judge, writer and Naval intelligence officer. She was educated at Brearley School, New York, Benenden School, Kent, and Lady Margaret Hall, Oxford, where she gained a BA in PPE, then studied under Ernst Gombrich at the Warburg Institute, London, where she gained her PhD degree.

Career
Montagu lectured in History of Art at Reading University 1958–64, and was assistant Curator 1964–71, and Curator 1971–91, of the Photographic Collection at the Warburg Institute. She was Slade Professor of Fine Art and fellow of Jesus College, Cambridge, 1980–81. She was Andrew W. Mellon Lecturer at the National Gallery of Art, Washington, in 1991 and Invited Professor at the Collège de France, Paris, in 1994. She was a trustee of the Wallace Collection 1989–2001 and of the British Museum 1994–2001.

Publications
Bronzes, Weidenfeld and Nicolson, London, 1963. 
Alessandro Algardi, Yale University Press 1985. 
Roman baroque sculpture : the industry of art, Yale University Press, 1989. 
The expression of the passions, Yale University Press, 1994 (originally presented as the author's doctoral thesis, Warburg Institute, 1959). 
Gold, Silver and Bronze: metal sculpture of the Roman Baroque, Princeton University Press, 1996.

Honours
In 1990, Montagu delivered the annual A. W. Mellon Lectures in the Fine Arts at the National Gallery of Art. Montagu was appointed LVO "for services to the Royal Collection" in 2006 and CBE "for services to Art History" in 2012. She is an honorary fellow of her alma mater, Lady Margaret Hall, Oxford, and of the Warburg Institute. She has been honoured in France as a Chevalier of the Légion d’honneur and a Commander of the Ordre des Arts et des Lettres, and in Italy as an Officer of the Order of Merit of the Italian Republic.

References

External links 
MONTAGU, Jennifer Iris Rachel Who's Who 2014, A & C Black, 2014 (online edition, Oxford University Press, 2014)

An Interview with Jennifer Montagu, The Art Tribune, 16 May 2008
In Conversation with Jennifer Montagu, Forma de Vida

1931 births
Living people
People educated at Benenden School
Alumni of Lady Margaret Hall, Oxford
Alumni of the Warburg Institute
British art historians
Women art historians
British Jews
Academics of the University of Reading
Academics of the Warburg Institute
Fellows of Jesus College, Cambridge
Commanders of the Order of the British Empire
Lieutenants of the Royal Victorian Order
Chevaliers of the Légion d'honneur
Commandeurs of the Ordre des Arts et des Lettres
Officers of the Order of Merit of the Italian Republic
Jennifer
Fellows of the British Academy
Brearley School alumni
British women curators